The European Intervention Initiative (EI2) is a joint military project between 13 European countries outside of existing structures, such as the North Atlantic Treaty Organization (NATO) and the European Union's (EU) defence arm. EI2 is planned to operate a "light" permanent secretariat based on the network of military liaison officers with the French defence ministry.

Background
The Initiative was first proposed by French President Emmanuel Macron in his Sorbonne keynote in September 2017. 9 members signed a Letter of Intent to begin work on 25 June 2018. Finland joined the military project on the 7th of November 2018.

Aims
The ultimate aim of the EI2 is a shared strategic culture that would enhance the ability of its members to act together on missions as part of NATO, the EU, UN or other ad hoc coalitions. The project is intended to be resource neutral and makes use of existing assets and other joint forces available to members. EI2 seeks for enhanced interaction on intelligence sharing, scenario planning, support operations and doctrine.

Participants
The participating countries is built around 11 current EU members plus Norway and the United Kingdom;
 Belgium
 Denmark
 Estonia
Finland
 France
 Germany
 Netherlands
 Norway
 Portugal
 Spain
 United Kingdom
 Sweden
 Italy

The UK, which has left the EU, was keen to join in order to “maintain cooperation with Europe beyond bilateral ties.” Italy initially was supportive but declined to sign the Letter of Intent with the other 9 members in July 2018; however, it signed the treaty on 19 September 2019 following a change in the Government coalition.

There are no specific criteria to a state participating in EI2, but it is built around:
Compatibility with the EU and NATO
Common vision regarding security concerns
Ability to deploy liaison officers
Long term efforts in defence
Commitment to European security operations
Ability to deploy effective capabilities.

Relationship with PESCO

EI2 seeks some synergies with the Permanent Structured Cooperation (PESCO) that has newly been established within the European Union's (EU) Common Security and Defence Policy (CSDP), and PESCO projects are intended to be integrated into the EI2 where feasible. France's concern is that developing the EI2 within PESCO would result in lengthy decision times or watered down ambition. This led to some tensions regarding the project between France and Germany, with the latter concerned that it would harm the EU's political cohesion.  Including the EI2 within PESCO is also seen as problematic as it prevents the participation of the UK and Denmark.

See also

Common Security and Defence Policy of the European Union
Permanent Structured Cooperation
Defence forces of the European Union
NATO
Western Union
Western European Union
Lancaster House Treaties
Combined Joint Expeditionary Force

References

International military organizations
Organizations established in 2018
2018 establishments in Europe